Banduk is a 1985 Australian television film shot in Nhulunbuy in East Arnhem Land, Northern Territory of Australia.

Plot
There is no dialogue in the film; the story is told in its imagery. The boy and girl (siblings) in the story (Banduk and Yalumul) realise that the ice-cream van owners are smuggling native animals out of Australia, including one of the Yolngu sacred animals, the red-collared lorikeet, or lindrij. With the help of Banduk's grandfather, they manage to trap the smugglers and are given a reward.

The sub-plot involves the children raising money to buy musical instruments for their band.

Cast
The cast is as follows: 
 Garry McDonald – Mr Kool
 Jone/Joan Winchester – Mrs Kool
 Bayulma Marika – Banduk
 Yalumul Marika – Yalumul
 Roy Marika – Grandad
 Gurumin Marika – Father
 Banduk Marika – Aunt
 Tommy Munyurran – Police aide

Production
Renowned Yolngu artist Banduk Marika served as Aboriginal consultant, and also played the role of Aunt in the film. Roy Marika, Banduk's uncle and renowned artist, plays the grandfather.

Release
The film was made by Channel 9 (now Nine Network) for the Second European Broadcasting Union (EBU) Drama Exchange for children, and released on Channel 9 in July 1985. It was released in the UK by Thames Television.

Reception
Cinema Papers gives the film a lukewarm review,  but The Sydney Morning Herald (Deirdre McPherson) called the film charming in its simplicity, and Bayulma Marika "most appealing as Banduk".

Footnotes

References

External links

Australian television films
1985 television films
1985 films
Films about Aboriginal Australians
Films directed by Di Drew
1980s English-language films